Nenad Mitrović (born 30 September 1970) is a Serbian politician who has been a member of the National Assembly of Serbia since 1 August 2022. A member of the Democratic Party, he has been one of the party's vice-presidents since 2021.

Early life 
Mitrović was born on 30 September 1970 in Vranje, SR Serbia, SFR Yugoslavia. He finished primary and secondary education in Vladičin Han and graduated from the Faculty of Veterinary Medicine in Belgrade.

Career 
Mitrović is a member of the Democratic Party. He was the president of the municipality of Vladičin Han from 2008 to 2012.

He became one of the party's vice-presidents in 2021. He was a candidate of the United for the Victory of Serbia coalition for the 2022 Serbian parliamentary election. He became a member of the National Assembly on 1 August 2022.

References 

1970 births
Living people
Serbian politicians
Democratic Party (Serbia) politicians
Members of the National Assembly (Serbia)
Mayors of places in Serbia